Ilja Wiederschein (born April 5, 1977 in Berlin) is a volleyball player from Germany, who played for the Men's National Team in the 2000s. He played as a setter, and is nicknamed "Ilse".

Honours
2001 FIVB World League — 13th place
2001 European Championship — 9th place
2002 FIVB World League — 9th place
2003 FIVB World League — 10th place
2003 European Championship — 7th place

References
  FIVB biography
  DVV Profile

1977 births
Living people
German men's volleyball players
Volleyball players from Berlin